The Eustrotiinae are a subfamily of moths, under family Noctuidae.

References

External links

 
Noctuidae